Kristina Vogel  (born 10 November 1990) is a former German track cyclist. During her career, she won two gold medals and a bronze at the Olympic Games, and is an eleven-time UCI World Champion. She was paralysed following a crash in June 2018.

Career
Vogel was born in Leninskoye, a district of Bishkek, the capital of Kyrgyzstan, and moved to Germany with her parents when she was six months old. In 2007 and 2008 she competed at the Junior European and World Championships and became a six-time junior world champion and two-time junior European champion.

In April 2009, Vogel was seriously injured after a collision with a minibus when riding on the roads near her home in Erfurt. She was in an artificial coma for two days. She recovered to compete at the 2010 UCI Track Cycling World Championships, where she finished fifth in the individual sprint and sixth in the team sprint alongside Miriam Welte. She also competed at the 2011 UCI Track Cycling World Championships.

At the 2012 UCI Track Cycling World Championships in Melbourne, Vogel and Welte won the gold medal in the team sprint. They set a world record in qualifying which they broke again in the final. Vogel and Welte went on to win the first ever Olympic gold medal in the women's team sprint later that year in London, benefiting from competitors being relegated in both the semifinal and final. At the 2016 Summer Olympics, she won another gold, in the women's sprint, and a bronze medal in the women's team sprint again with Miriam Welte.

On 26 June 2018, in the Cottbus velodrome, Vogel collided at high speed with a Dutch junior cyclist who was practising a standing start. The heavy impact on the concrete floor caused several fractures, severing her spinal cord at the seventh thoracic vertebrae and consequently caused paraplegia. Vogel's teammate Maximilian Levy was the first to come to her aid, and following the accident, he and fellow cyclist Max Dörnbach, using the hashtag #staystrongkristina, went on to raise €119,752 for her recovery.  The Dutch cyclist was uninjured, but Vogel was left paralysed.

In addition to her track cycling career, Vogel was a part-time police officer before her accident. In 2019, she entered politics, standing for election as a candidate for the Christian Democratic Union of Germany in Erfurt city council elections.

Major results

2008
UCI World Junior Track Championships
1st  Keirin
1st  Sprint
1st  500m time trial
2nd Sprint, Grand Prix de Vitesse de Saint Denis
2014
UEC European Championships
1st  Keirin
2nd Team Sprint (with Miriam Welte)
3rd Sprint
Cottbuser SprintCup
1st Keirin
1st Sprint
1st 500m Time Trial
Memorial of Alexander Lesnikov
1st Keirin
1st Sprint
1st 500m Time Trial
Cottbuser SprintCup (2)
1st Keirin
2nd Sprint
GP von Deutschland im Sprint
1st Keirin
1st Sprint
Cottbuser Nächte
1st Keirin
1st Sprint
1st Team Sprint (with Miriam Welte)
1st Sprint, Track-Cycling Challenge Grenchen
2015
Cottbuser SprintCup
1st Keirin
2nd Sprint
GP von Deutschland im Sprint
1st Keirin
3rd Team Sprint (with Miriam Welte)
Internationale Radsport Meeting
1st Keirin
1st Sprint
1st 500m Time Trial
1st Keirin, Cottbuser Nächte
UEC European Track Championships
2nd Team Sprint (with Miriam Welte)
3rd Sprint
2nd Sprint, Cottbuser SprintCup
2nd Sprint, Dudenhofen
3rd Keirin, Öschelbronn
2016
GP von Deutschland im Sprint
1st Keirin
1st Sprint
1st Team Sprint (with Miriam Welte)
Cottbuser SprintCup
1st Sprint
2nd Keirin
3rd 500m Time Trial
2017
UCI World Track Championships
1st  Keirin
3rd Team Sprint (with Miriam Welte)
1st  Sprint, Round 1, (Pruszków) Track Cycling World Cup
UEC European Track Championships
1st  Keirin
1st  Sprint
2nd Team Sprint (with Miriam Welte)
1st Sprint, Öschelbronn
1st Keirin, Oberhausen
1st Sprint, Dudenhofen
Cottbuser SprintCup
1st Keirin
1st Sprint
1st Sprint GP von Deutschland im Sprint
National Track Championships
1st  Keirin
1st  Sprint
1st  Team Sprint (with Pauline Grabosch)
3rd 500m Time Trial

References

External links

Living people
1990 births
German female cyclists
Kyrgyzstani people of German descent
German people of Kyrgyzstani descent
Citizens of Germany through descent
UCI Track Cycling World Champions (women)
Cyclists at the 2012 Summer Olympics
Cyclists at the 2016 Summer Olympics
Olympic cyclists of Germany
Olympic gold medalists for Germany
Olympic bronze medalists for Germany
Olympic medalists in cycling
People from Chüy Region
Medalists at the 2012 Summer Olympics
Medalists at the 2016 Summer Olympics
German track cyclists
People with paraplegia
People from Sömmerda (district)
Cyclists from Thuringia
20th-century German women
21st-century German women
Soviet emigrants to Germany